2T or 2-T may refer to:

2T, IATA code for Haïti Ambassador Airlines
2T, IATA code for the former Canada 3000 airline
2T, a series of Toyota T engine models
2T Stalker, armoured vehicle used by the Belarusian Army
2T oil; see Two-stroke oil
2-T-1, a model of Great Lakes Sport Trainer
J-2T, a model of J-2 (rocket engine)
2T, abbreviation of Alisport Silent 2 Targa
2T, means Parrot in Persian and it's a nickname for an Iranian guy named Behnam

Locomotives
2T, a series of locomotive models
2-6-2T; see 2-6-2
LMS Stanier 2-6-2T
Welsh 0-6-2T locomotives
LMS Fowler 2-6-2T
LMS Ivatt Class 2 2-6-2T
GWR 2-6-2T
0-6-2T; see 0-6-2
Port Talbot Railway 0-6-2T (Stephenson)
BR Standard Class 3 2-6-2T
Port Talbot Railway 0-8-2T (Cooke)
BR Standard Class 2 2-6-2T
South African Class A 4-8-2T
Port Talbot Railway 0-8-2T (Sharp Stewart)
South African Class H2 4-8-2T
South African Class H1 4-8-2T
South African Class H 4-10-2T
Bristol and Exeter Railway 2-2-2T locomotives
0-4-2T; see 0-4-2
0-8-2T; see 0-8-2
4-4-2T; see 4-4-2 (locomotive)
4-6-2T; see 4-6-2
4-8-2T; see 4-8-2
2-10-2T; see 2-10-2

See also
T2 (disambiguation)
TT (disambiguation)
T-square (disambiguation), including T-squared